Delia Cecilia Giovanola (16 February 1926 – 18 July 2022) was an Argentine human rights activist. She was a co-founder of Grandmothers of the Plaza de Mayo.

References 

1926 births
2022 deaths
Argentine human rights activists
Grandmothers of the Plaza de Mayo
People from La Plata